Yolobus provides public transportation throughout Yolo County, California and into downtown Sacramento, western Sacramento County and northeastern Solano County. 

The Yolobus fleet consists of 50 compressed natural gas (CNG) buses and 10 paratransit vehicles. Yolobus is administered by Yolo County Transportation District and bus operations have been contracted to Transdev (formerly Veolia Transport) since 2006.

Fares 
Riders pay different fares depending on route. Regular and Commute route pay a base fare while express riders pay a higher express fare. Yolobus offers day passes that are also valid on SacRT

Routes 
Yolobus provides bus service to Yolo County, California, and also to western Sacramento County and northeastern Solano County. The following cities are served: Sacramento, West Sacramento, Southport, Davis, Woodland, Cache Creek, Madison, Esparto, Capay, Knights Landing, Dunnigan, Yolo, Vacaville.

Most regular routes run hourly, 5–7 days a week. Commute and express routes run only at peak times in the mornings and evenings, Monday-Friday.

Regular Routes 
35 – Southport Local (via Westacre / Jefferson / Marshall)
40 – West Sacramento Local (counter-clockwise) / Sacramento
41 – West Sacramento Local (clockwise) / Sacramento
42A – Intercity Loop (via Sacramento / Airport / Woodland / Davis / West Sacramento)
42B – Intercity Loop (via Sacramento / West Sacramento / Davis / Woodland / Airport)
210 – West Woodland Local (counter-clockwise)
211 – West Woodland Local (clockwise)
212 – East Woodland Local (counter-clockwise)
214 – East Woodland Local (clockwise)
215 – Cache Creek Casino / Woodland
216 – Knights Landing / Woodland (MWF, Second Saturday of each month)
217 – Dunnigan / Yolo / Woodland (Tuesday & Thursday only)
220 – Vacaville / Winters / Davis (via I-505 / Road 31)
240 – West Sacramento / Sacramento Shuttle (via West Capitol / Harbor / Reed)

Commuter Routes 
39 – Southport / Sacramento
220C – Winters / Davis
241 – West Sacramento / Sacramento (via West Capitol / Industrial / Enterprise)
242 – Woodland / Davis
243 – Woodland (Spring Lake) / Davis
340 – Raley's Landing (CalSTRS/Ziggurat) / Downtown Sacramento (only during major events at Golden 1 Center)

Express Routes 
43 – Davis / Sacramento (via F Street / Covell / Alhambra)
43R – Sacramento / UC Davis (reverse commute)
44 – South Davis / Sacramento (via Anderson / Cowell / Chiles)
45 – Woodland / Sacramento (via Cottonwood / Gibson / Matmor)
45X – Spring Lake / Sacramento (via Miekle / Gum / Matmor)
46 – Spring Lake / Sacramento (via Miekle / Farnham / Maxwell)
230 – West Davis / Sacramento (via Anderson / Covell / Arlington)
232 – Davis / Sacramento (via Covell / Alhambra / Chiles)

Previous Routes 

209 – East Woodland / Springlake Shuttle
231 – Sacramento / Davis

References

External links 
 Yolobus
 List of Yolobus routes and descriptions

Bus transportation in California
Public transportation in Yolo County, California
Transportation in Sacramento, California